The Chain Tower (1384) (French:La tour de la Chaîne) along with the Lantern tower and the Saint Nicolas Tower, is one of the three medieval towers guarding the port in La Rochelle, France. It is called the Chain tower because an actual chain was stretched across the port entrance from this building. In 1879 the French government classified it as a Monument historique (MH).

History
This tower along with the Saint Nicolas Tower stood at the entryway to the Port of La Rochelle. The way this tower got its name: at times throughout history a chain was stretched between the two buildings to stop ships from entering. Throughout history the building was also used to store gunpowder. The tower has not changed much since the 14th century.

See also
Centre des monuments nationaux
Vauclair castle
La Rochelle Cathedral

References

External links
 
 La Rochelle et Son Histoire: Tours 
 Église paroissiale Saint-Barthélemy à La Rochelle 
Photos, French Ministry of Culture

Buildings and structures in La Rochelle
Tourist attractions in La Rochelle
Historic sites in France
Monuments historiques of Nouvelle-Aquitaine